Oued Zenati  is a town and commune in Guelma Province, Algeria. According to the 1998 census it had a population of 27,254 which progressed to reach 55,000 in 2010.

History 

During the Numidian era (399BC-50BC), the region was highly cultivated and protected by military points spread all over the place, still present today.

The town's Early African Christian history is portrayed in the Eloa status in the town agora. Eloa, the angel of sorrow and compassion in Christian Mythology is said to have been born from a tear Jesus shed. In Alfred de Vigny's poem Eloa, we find Jesus at Lazarus' grave. He is deeply moved by the grief of Martha and Mary after losing their brother. So he sheds one heavenly tear, and Eloa is born.

Geography 

It is located 40 km (to the West) from Guelma, 110 km of Annaba and 70 km from Constantine. Oued Zenati is also the name of a river in the commune. The village has an agricultural vocation, very poor industrially.

Related people 

 Taïeb Boulahrouf an Algerian politician, born in 1923

References 

Communes of Guelma Province